"State of Independence"  is the third episode of the second season of the American television drama series Homeland, and the 15th episode overall.  It originally aired on Showtime on October 14, 2012.

Plot 
Saul (Mandy Patinkin) is boarding a plane home from Beirut Airport when he is pulled aside by a uniformed soldier. He is then led to a closed room and questioned by a well-dressed man implied to be an intelligence officer. Saul is traveling on a diplomatic passport and refuses questioning on grounds of diplomatic immunity. He attempts to intimidate the man, but is forced to grudgingly comply and open the diplomatic bag. The intelligence officer clearly knows what to look for, and eventually finds a memory card inside the lining. Saul is then allowed to proceed home. Once aboard the plane, he removes the real memory card from a secret compartment inside the briefcase handle and puts it into his pocket.

Carrie (Claire Danes) stays up all night excitedly writing a report on her mission to Beirut. Galvez (Hrach Titizian) picks up the report the next morning and tells Carrie to come to Langley that evening for a debriefing.

On the day that he is scheduled to make a speech at Jessica's (Morena Baccarin) fundraiser, Brody (Damian Lewis) gets a call from Roya (Zuleikha Robinson). Roya explains that the CIA has acquired intelligence which leads to the tailor (Nasser Faris) in Gettysburg who crafted Brody's suicide vest. She says that the tailor needs to be picked up and brought to a safehouse, but that it must be done by someone he knows, namely Brody. Brody makes the drive to Gettysburg and picks up the tailor who is reluctant to go. The tailor nervously asks what fate awaits him when he gets to the safehouse, to which Brody has no answers. A flat tire delays their trip. While Brody is changing the tire, the tailor considers attacking Brody with a rock but does not get a chance.

Carrie arrives at Langley early, only to become agitated when she finds that the debriefing session is already in progress. Estes (David Harewood) takes Carrie aside and tells her that he decided it would be better to have the debrief without her. He compliments Carrie on the quality of her work in Beirut, but shoots down any possibility of her reinstatement, which visibly upsets her.

During a stop at a gas station, the tailor runs away. Brody chases him into a nearby forest. The tailor hits Brody from behind with a large rock and runs away. Brody is able to chase him down and tackle him, then realizing that the tailor has been impaled on a stake that was sticking out of the ground. The tailor begs to be taken to a hospital. Brody refuses, instead doing his best to administer first aid and stop the bleeding. Jessica calls Brody on his cell phone. Brody explains his tardiness by saying that he got a flat tire. The tailor, in his weakened state, moans for help while Brody is on the phone. Brody tries to keep him quiet, but with his efforts unsuccessful, he kills the tailor by breaking his neck. Jessica hears the commotion over the phone and can tell something is amiss.

Carrie arrives back at her apartment after abruptly moving out of her father's house. She changes into a cocktail dress, seemingly to go out and hunt for a one-night stand, but then stops herself. Instead, she devours over a dozen pills along with a lot of wine and proceeds to lie down on her bed, waiting to die. After a short time, she reconsiders, bolting to the bathroom and forcing herself to vomit up the pills.

At the fundraiser, Jessica makes a speech in place of Brody. She speaks about her family's many struggles when Brody returned after eight years of being held captive. She proposes an initiative to help families with the process of reintegrating with returning war veterans. The speech is very well received.  Brody buries the tailor in the forest and heads home, having missed the fundraiser entirely. Mike (Diego Klattenhoff) brings Jessica home from the fundraiser. Jessica vents her frustrations and tells Mike about Brody's affair with Carrie. Jessica invites Mike inside for a drink when Brody interrupts with his arrival. Inside the house, Jessica demands the truth from Brody, not believing any of his excuses for his absence. Brody sticks to his story, while Jessica stresses that their marriage cannot continue to go on like this.

Carrie is woken up by the arrival of Saul, who tells her that he came straight to her house from Lebanon with a key piece of intelligence that she obtained. Overwhelmed by emotions, Carrie exclaims "I was right!" as she watches the video of Brody's confession.

Production 
The episode was written by executive producer Alexander Cary, and was directed by Lodge Kerrigan, director of the feature film Keane which also starred Damian Lewis.

Reception

Ratings
The original American broadcast received 1.48 million viewers, which decreased in viewership from the previous episode.

Critical response
HitFix's Alan Sepinwall called it a "great episode" and "an early contender for Claire Danes' next Emmy submission".  In summary, Sepinwall said that "the plot on 'Homeland' may occasionally not work, but these characters at the center of it are so compelling that it's often all that really matters".

Emily VanDerWerff of The A.V. Club graded the episode a "B", feeling that Carrie's scenes were expertly done, but that the developments in Brody's storyline were too contrived.

The Washington Posts Ned Martel hailed the performance of Claire Danes as "beyond great", and said that "three episodes and three weeks after she took home the industry’s big prize, it already feels like time to give Claire Danes next year’s award too."

Awards and nominations
Morena Baccarin received a nomination for the Primetime Emmy Award for Outstanding Supporting Actress in a Drama Series at the 65th Primetime Emmy Awards for her performance in this episode.

References

External links 
 "State of Independence" at Showtime
 

2012 American television episodes
Homeland (season 2) episodes